Arthur Charles Humphreys-Owen (9 November 1836 – 9 December 1905) was a Welsh barrister, landowner and Liberal politician.

Humphreys-Owen was born at Garthmyl, Montgomeryshire, the son of Erskine Humphreys, a barrister. He was educated at Harrow School and Trinity College, Cambridge. In 1874 he married Maria Russell, the daughter of a Queen's Counsel.

Humphreys-Owen was himself called to the bar at Lincoln's Inn in 1863. He later became a Justice of the Peace. He was chairman of the Cambrian Railways Company from 1900. In 1876 he had inherited the estates of the Owens of Glansevern and added the name Owen to his surname.

He was sometime Deputy Lieutenant of Montgomeryshire and was chairman of Montgomeryshire County Council. He was a strong supporter of education and chaired the Central Welsh Board for Intermediate Education from 1896 to 1905. From 1894 he was elected Liberal Member of Parliament  for Montgomeryshire in a by-election to succeed Stuart Rendel on his elevation to the peerage. He scraped home in the election by only 225 votes, a drop from Rendel's majority of 600 but he held the seat until his death, aged 69, in 1905.

References

Who was Who, OUP 2008
K O Morgan, Montgomeryshire’s Liberal Century: Rendel to Hooson, 1880-1979; The Welsh History Review, 16:1, June 1992
 Welsh Political Archive at the National Library of Wales
K O Morgan, Wales in British Politics 1868-1922; University of Wales Press, 1963

External links 
 

1836 births
1905 deaths
Liberal Party (UK) MPs for Welsh constituencies
Members of Lincoln's Inn
Welsh barristers
People educated at Harrow School
Directors of the Cambrian Railways
Welsh landowners
UK MPs 1892–1895
UK MPs 1895–1900
UK MPs 1900–1906
19th-century British businesspeople